Hugh Francis Routley (19 June 1940 – 12 September 2020) was an Australian rules footballer who played with Geelong in the VFL. 

Routley debuted in 1959 and managed to play just 8 games coming into the 1963 season.

On 6 July 1963 he was a member of the Geelong team that were comprehensively and unexpectedly beaten by Fitzroy, 9.13 (67) to 3.13 (31) in the 1963 Miracle Match.

Playing on the wing, Routley became a regular in the side during 1963 and was a member of their premiership side.

See also
 1963 Miracle Match

References

External links

1940 births
2020 deaths
Australian rules footballers from Victoria (Australia)
Geelong Football Club players
Geelong Football Club Premiership players
Eaglehawk Football Club players
One-time VFL/AFL Premiership players